Marquis is a barbershop quartet that won the 1995 SPEBSQSA international competition. Originating from the Cincinnati-Dayton area, they won the championship less than two years after they formed.

Their lead singer, Randy Chisholm, was the first Canadian-born singer in a champion SPEBSQSA quartet. Singing tenor was Dale Fetick, while both bass Jay Hawkins and baritone Paul Gilman had sung previously in 1987 champion quartet Interstate Rivals. They appeared in two 1996 PBS special productions "Voices In Harmony" and the Cincinnati Pops Orchestra Halloween concert. They produced two compact discs: Diamond Cuts and In The Wee Small Hours.

The quartet suffered a loss with the death of Randy in 1997. Although they recruited Denny Gore as lead to fulfill remaining commitments, they disbanded after a few years.

Discography
In The Wee Small Hours (CD)
Diamond Cuts (CD)

References

External links
 Marquis singers.com
 AIC entry, archived version (with more information)

Barbershop quartets
Barbershop Harmony Society